Eupoca sanctalis is a moth in the family Crambidae. It is found from central Costa Rica south to northern Colombia.

References

Moths described in 1912
Glaphyriinae